Mana (born 26 December 1979) is a Finnish drummer, bassist, singer, guitarist and record producer. He is best known as the current drummer of the Finnish metal band Lordi. Mana uses Tama drums and his own Balbex signature sticks. He is a fan of Kiss, Ian Paice, Cozy Powell and Vinny Appice. He has produced songs and albums for various Finnish bands.

Discography

Lordi 
 To Beast or Not to Beast (2013)
 Scare Force One (2014)
 Monstereophonic (Theaterror vs. Demonarchy) (2016)
 Sexorcism (2018)
 Recordead Live – Sextourcism in Z7 (live, 2019)
 Killection (2020)
 Lordiversity (2021)
 Screem Writers Guild (2023)

Other 
 Martti Servo: Sinisellä Sydämellä (2013)

References

External links 

 Mana page on Lordi.fi

1979 births
Living people
Lordi members
Finnish heavy metal drummers
Finnish rock drummers
Finnish rock musicians
musicians from Tampere
21st-century drummers
Masked musicians